Tocosh (also known as togosh) is a traditional Quechua food prepared from fermented potato pulp (maize is less common). It is often prepared for celebration events and has a strong odor and flavor. Tocosh can be used as a natural antibiotic because penicillin is produced during the fermentation process. Medicinally it is used for the common cold, gastric ulcers, pneumonia, and altitude sickness among others. The Incas believed it was a gift from Inti for preservation of the body.

The fermentation process of creating tocosh was discovered by the Incas (or possibly one of the many tribes in their empire). Fermentation is achieved by placing either potato pulp or maize in a mesh bag of grass, covered with stones, and left undisturbed for six to twelve months within a pool of water where there is a current (the pool usually found naturally or dug on the banks of a stream). The current flows through the stones to wash away bacteria during fermentation. Once fermentation has occurred, the tocosh is dried in the sun and stored for future use.

The most common preparation in the Huánuco region of Peru is to make a mazamorra or jelly-like dessert.

See also
Pachamanca

References

Peruvian cuisine
Native American cuisine
Fermented foods